Pierre Morice (born 25 March 1962) is a French former professional footballer who played as a midfielder.

Career
Pierre played seven seasons for FC Nantes in the 1980s, where he was part of the French Division 1 winning team. He was also part of the Nantes squad that went on to the final rounds of the UEFA Cup (what is now the Champions League) where he scored the winning goal against Spartak Moscow in the round of 16.

He went onto play for Division 1 teams Chamois Niortais, AS Saint-Etienne, and OGC Nice before moving to the United States where he finished out his career in the USL with the Minnesota Thunder (now the Minnesota United FC).

Personal life
His son, Max Morice, played one season of college soccer at Yale, before signing a professional contract with Ligue 1 club Rennes in August 2012.

Honours
Nantes
French Division 1: 1982–83
Coupe de France runner-up: 1982–83

References

External links
Profile

1962 births
Living people
French footballers
Association football midfielders
Ligue 1 players
Ligue 2 players
American Professional Soccer League players
FC Nantes players
Chamois Niortais F.C. players
AS Saint-Étienne players
OGC Nice players
Tampa Bay Rowdies (1975–1993) players
Minnesota Thunder players
USL First Division players
French expatriate footballers
French expatriate sportspeople in the United States
Expatriate soccer players in the United States